Federico Giraudo (born 11 August 1998) is an Italian football player. He plays for  club Cittadella on loan from Reggina.

Club career

Torino 
Born in Cuneo, Giraudo was a youth exponent of Torino.

Loan to Vicenza 
On 26 July 2017, Giraudo was signed by Serie C side Vicenza on a season-long loan deal. Four days later, on 30 July, he made his debut for Vicenza as a substitute replacing Luzayadio Bangu in the 72nd minute of a 4–1 home win over Pro Piacenza in the first round of Coppa Italia. Four more weeks later, on 27 August, he made his Serie C debut for Vicenza as a substitute replacing Pietro Beruatto in the 81st minute of a 3–0 home win over Gubbio. On 4 October he played his first entire match for Vicenza, a 2–1 home win over Alma Juventus Fano. He also helps the club to avoid relegation in Serie D winning the play-out matches 3–2 on aggregate against Santarcangelo. Giraudo ended his season-long loan to Vicenza with 32 appearances, including 23 of them as a starter, and 2 assists.

Loan to Ternana 
On 23 July 2018, Giraudo was loaned to Serie C club Ternana on a season-long loan deal. One week later, on 29 July, he made his debut for Ternana in a match won 4–2 at penalties after a 1–1 home draw against Pontedera in the first round of Coppa Italia, he played the entire match. Three months later, on 4 November, he made his Serie C debut for Ternana as a substitute replacing Aniello Sanzano in the 68th minute of a 4–1 away win over Monza. He became Ternana's first-choice after the start of the season. One more month later, on 4 December, Giraudo played his first match as a starter, a 3–0 home win over Rimini, he was replaced by Daniele Gasparetto after 84 minutes. Giraudo ended his loan to Ternana with 25 appearances, 12 of them as a sterter.

Loan to Cesena 
On 3 September 2019, Giraudo was loaned back again in Serie C and he joined to newly promoted club Cesena on a season-long loan deal. Five days later, on 8 September, he made his debut for the club in a 2–0 away win over Virtus Verona, he was replaced by Andrea Ciofi in the 87th minute. Three more weeks later, on 21 September, he played his first entire match for Cesena, a 1–1 home draw against Piacenza. Giraudo ended his season-long loan to Cesena with only 11 appearances, including 7 of them as a starter, playing only 3 entire matches, however he remained an unused substitute for 12 other league matches.

Vis Pesaro 
On 8 October 2020, Giraudo joined to Serie C club Vis Pesaro on a free-transfer signing a 2-year contract. Nine days later, on 17 October, he made his debut for the club as a substitute replacing Valerio Nava in the 62nd minute of a 0–0 away draw against Virtus Verona. Four more days later, on 21 October, Giraudo played his first match as a starter for Vis Pesaro, a 1–0 home defeat against Triestina, he was replaced by Valerio Nava in the 70th minute. On 1 November he scored his first professional goal in the 77th minute of a 1–0 home win over Gubbio. One week later, on 8 November, he played his first entire match for the club, a 1–0 away defeat against FeralpiSalò.

Reggina
On 14 January 2022 he went to Reggina on loan with a conditional obligation to buy.

Loan to Cittadella
On 25 January 2023, Giraudo extended his contract with Reggina until 30 June 2025 and was loaned to Cittadella until 30 June 2024, with an option to buy.

International career 
Giraudo represented Italy at Under-17, Under-18 and Under-19 levels. On 17 December 2014 he made his debut at U-17 level and he scored his first goal in the 75th minute of a 4–1 away win over Iran U-17, he played the entire match. Giraudo played all 3 matches in the elite round of the 2015 UEFA European Under-17 Championship qualification. He was a member of the team who played in the 2015 UEFA European Under-17 Championship, here, Giraudo played 5 matches and he make 1 assist. On 12 August 2015, Giraudo made his debut at U-18 level in a 0–0 home draw against Bulgaria U-19, he was replaced by Luca Coccolo in the 80th minute. On 13 April 2016 he played his first entire match for Italy U-18, a 2–1 home defeat against France U-18. On 11 August 2016, Giraudo made his debut at U-19 level as a substitute replacing Pietro Beruatto in the 54th minute of a 1–0 home defeat against Croatia U-19.

Career statistics

Club

Honours

Club 
Torino Primavera

 Supercoppa Primavera: 2015

References

External links
 

1998 births
People from Cuneo
Sportspeople from the Province of Cuneo
Footballers from Piedmont
Living people
Italian footballers
Italy youth international footballers
Association football defenders
L.R. Vicenza players
Ternana Calcio players
Vis Pesaro dal 1898 players
Reggina 1914 players
A.S. Cittadella players
Serie B players
Serie C players